The West Melbourne Gasworks was a coal gasification plant in West Melbourne, Victoria, Australia.

History

Melbourne was settled in 1835 and by the early 1850s, the gold rushes had led to rapid population growth. The City of Melbourne Gas and Coke Company leased 5 acres (2 hectares) of Crown Land in 1854 to construct a plant for the gasification of black coal. The works operated until 1962, importing coal via a dedicated wharf and a system of narrow gauge tracks drawn by steam locomotives. Several of these locomotives have been preserved and are now used on the Puffing Billy Railway. 

In 1962, the works were upgraded to incorporate a catalytic oil gas facility, but this was short-lived. In 1970, the works was closed down and the remaining structures were all demolished by 1974.

Site extent

The works were gradually expanded between 1900 and 1910, eventually covering 8 hectares in an area now extending from Waterview Walk to the Yarra River, with the new Collins Street extension and Harbour Esplanade running through the site.

References

Coal gasification technologies
Industrial gases
Chemical plants
Fuel gas
Industrial buildings
Former power stations in Australia
Buildings and structures demolished in 1974
1854 establishments in Australia
1970 disestablishments in Australia
Demolished buildings and structures in Melbourne